The seventh and final season of the American television sitcom New Girl premiered on Fox on April 10, 2018, at 9:30pm (Eastern), and concluded on May 15, 2018.

Developed by Elizabeth Meriwether under the working title Chicks & Dicks, the series revolves around offbeat teacher Jess (Zooey Deschanel) after her moving into an LA loft with three men, Nick (Jake Johnson), Schmidt (Max Greenfield), and Winston (Lamorne Morris); Jess's best friend Cece (Hannah Simone) also appears regularly. The characters, who are in their thirties, deal with maturing relationships and career choices.

Cast and characters

Main cast
 Zooey Deschanel as Jessica "Jess" Day
 Jake Johnson as Nick Miller
 Max Greenfield as Schmidt
 Lamorne Morris as Winston Bishop
 Hannah Simone as Cece
 Danielle Rockoff and Rhiannon Rockoff as Ruth

Special guest cast
 Damon Wayans Jr. as Coach

Recurring cast
 Brian Huskey as Merle Streep
 Dermot Mulroney as Russell
 Nasim Pedrad as Aly
 Rob Reiner as  Bob Day

Guest cast
 
 David Neher as Benjamin
 Nelson Franklin as Robby
 David Walton as Sam
 Sam Richardson as Dunston
 Steve Agee as Outside Dave
 Ayden Mayeri as Leslie
 Gillian Vigman as Kim
 JB Smoove as Van Bishop
 Sarah Baker as Judith
 Quinta Brunson as Annabelle
 Rebecca Reid as Nadia
 Jamie Lee Curtis as Joan
 Ralph Ahn as Tran
 June Diane Raphael as Sadie
 Brian Posehn as Bio Teacher
 Curtis Armstrong as Principal Foster
 Zoe Lister Jones as Fawn Moscato

Episodes

Reception
On review aggregator website Rotten Tomatoes, the season holds an approval rating of 100% based on 10 reviews, with an average rating of 6.78. The site's critical consensus reads, "After seven years of friendship, New Girl signs off with a thoughtful, funny final season that bids a proper adieu to its colourful cast of characters."

References

External links
 New Girl episode listings at The Futon Critic 

New Girl
2018 American television seasons